The following is a list of South-West Indian Ocean tropical cyclones before the year 1900, or 20th century.

Storms

1848
On January 11, 1848, the first tropical cyclone on record was observed in the basin.

April 1892 Mauritius cyclone

1200 deaths - 50,000 homeless. The most dramatic and the most devastating cyclone in the history of the country. Sugar production fell 42%. A third of the city of Port Louis was destroyed in a few hours.

February 1899 Madagascar cyclone

See also

 South-West Indian Ocean tropical cyclone
 List of Australian region cyclones before 1900
 Pre-1900 South Pacific cyclone seasons

References

0000
Lists of tropical cyclones